XHYP-FM is a radio station in Ciudad Mante, Tamaulipas. It broadcasts on 93.9 FM from a transmitter in the neighboring municipality of El Limón and carries a Regional Mexican format known as La Chabela 93.9.

History
XEYP-AM 1520 was awarded to Enrique Cárdenas González in 1964 and received its concession five years later. It was cleared to migrate to FM in December 2011.

In January 2017, XHYP flipped from Imagen Radio to Di 93.9, an English-language classic hits format. The branding and format were changed again in July 2020.

References

Radio stations in Ciudad Mante